Cephalotes porrasi is a species of arboreal ant of the genus Cephalotes, from central America. The soldier caste has the upper part of its head shaped like a disk. The worker caste has the ability to "parachute" by steering its fall if it dropss off a tree, leading the ants to also have been classified as gliding ants.

References

External links 
 Cephalotes porrasi at AntWiki

porrasi
Insects described in 1942